The Kurds are an ethnic group in Western Asia. 

Kurd may also refer to:

Places
 Kord-e Olya, Iran, a village also known as Kurd
 Kord-e Sofla, Iran, a village also known as Kurd
 Kurd, Hungary, a village
 Kurd Mountains, a highland region in Syria and Turkey
 Kürd (disambiguation), several places in Azerbaijan

Other uses
 Kūrd, a Brahui tribe of Pakistan
 Kurd (name), a given name and surname, including a list of people with this name
 Uppsala Kurd FK, a Swedish football club based in Uppsala

See also
 Curd (disambiguation)
 Kurdi (disambiguation)
 Kord, Iran